Natural Falls State Park is a  state-owned park in the Ozarks, in Delaware County, Oklahoma. It lies along U.S. Highway 412, near the Arkansas-Oklahoma state line. The property was privately-owned and known as Dripping Springs until 1990, when the state bought it. The previous owners had also used the property as an attraction and rest stop for travelers on the highway, featuring a swimming pool and gardens. The site was used in the production of the 1974 film "Where the Red Fern Grows".

Features 
Located in northeast Oklahoma in the scenic Ozark Highlands region, Natural Falls State Park features a  waterfall cascading through rock formations and creating a hidden, serene atmosphere at the bottom of a narrow V-shaped valley. An observation platform with a nearby picnic pavilion overlooks the falls and a deck with seating is available at the base of the falls. As the stream falls, enough evaporation occurs to drop the bulk liquid temperature about ten degrees (Fahrenheit) by the time it reaches the bottom. This maintains a cool, moist environment that is favorable to the growth of many types of flora in the valley. A graduate student from Oklahoma State University (OSU) performed a plant study at the site about the time it was purchased by the state, and counted over 18 varieties of ferns alone. Since preserving the plant life is a priority for park management, swimming has been prohibited in the catchment ever since.

Picnic tables and grills can be found throughout the park. Campsites, including 44 RV sites and 27 tent sites, and a comfort station with showers are also on site.

The park offers yurts for a rather unique overnighting experience, now called glamping.  At Natural Falls State Park, each yurt is a circular tent that sits above ground on a wooden deck. There are different sizes, accommodating from two to eight people. Each is equipped with beds, refrigerator, coffee maker, microwave, skylights, and even air-conditioning. According to Tracey Robertson, park manager, the park installed five yurts which can be rented by park visitors.

The Red Fern Reunion Center is available for group functions. Pets are allowed on a leash only.

The park affords an opportunity to observe a variety of plant and animal life. Hikers will find a dense forest of maples, chinquapin, and white oaks, while plants such as flowering dogwood, sassafras, coralberry, spicebush, redbud, and pawpaw blanket the cool forest floor. The waterfall creates a moist environment where ferns, mosses, and liverworts thrive.

This is one of the two tallest known waterfalls in the state, matching Turner Falls in the Arbuckle Mountains. The falls are known to local residents as Dripping Springs Falls, but the State renamed the park as Natural Falls to distinguish it from Dripping Springs State Park, now known as Dripping Springs Park, and other sites in Oklahoma with similar names. The park can pump water from the pool below the falls back to the top of the falls, to insure that the waterfall is active all year long.

Accessibility 
Most visitors arrive by private auto, since there is no public transportation in the area. The park is located on U.S. Highway 412. The route complies with requirements of the Americans with Disabilities Act of 1990.

Fees
To help fund a backlog of deferred maintenance and park improvements, the state implemented an entrance fee for this park and 21 others effective June 15, 2020.  The fees, charged per vehicle, start at $10 per day for a single-day or $8 for residents with an Oklahoma license plate or Oklahoma tribal plate.  Fees are waived for honorably discharged veterans and Oklahoma residents age 62 & older and their spouses.  Passes good for three days or a week are also available; annual passes good at all 22 state parks charging fees are offered at a cost of $75 for out-of-state visitors or $60 for Oklahoma residents.  The 22 parks are:
 Arrowhead Area at Lake Eufaula State Park
 Beavers Bend State Park
 Boiling Springs State Park
 Cherokee Landing State Park
 Fort Cobb State Park
 Foss State Park
 Honey Creek Area at Grand Lake State Park
 Great Plains State Park
 Great Salt Plains State Park
 Greenleaf State Park
 Keystone State Park
 Lake Eufaula State Park
 Lake Murray State Park
 Lake Texoma State Park
 Lake Thunderbird State Park
 Lake Wister State Park
 Natural Falls State Park
 Osage Hills State Park
 Robbers Cave State Park
 Sequoyah State Park
 Tenkiller State Park
 Twin Bridges Area at Grand Lake State Park

Notes

References

See also 
 Glamping
 Yurt

Protected areas of Delaware County, Oklahoma
Waterfalls of Oklahoma
State parks of Oklahoma
State parks of the U.S. Interior Highlands
Landforms of Delaware County, Oklahoma
Parks established in 1990